Sydney Football Club is an association football club based in Moore Park, Sydney, who was formed in 2004. They became the first member from Sydney admitted into the A-League Men in 2005.

Rhyan Grant holds the record for the greatest number of appearances for Sydney FC with 290 games. Alex Brosque holds the goalscoring record with 83 goals.

Key
 The list is ordered first by date of debut, and then if necessary in alphabetical order.
 Appearances as a substitute are included.
 Statistics are correct up to and including the match played on 14 January 2023. Where a player left the club permanently after this date, his statistics are updated to his date of leaving.

Players

Players highlighted in bold are still actively playing at Sydney FC.

Captains
Seven players have captained Sydney FC since it was founded in 2004, the first being Mark Rudan, who captained the team until 2007. The club's longest-serving captain is Alex Brosque, who captained the club for five years between 2014–2019. The current captain is Alex Wilkinson.

References
General
 
 
 

Specific

 
Lists of soccer players by club in Australia
Sydney-sport-related lists
Association football player non-biographical articles